Robert Henderson (27 January 1934 – 8 June 2019 ) was an Australian rules footballer who played with Fitzroy in the Victorian Football League (VFL).

Henderson made 137 appearances for Fitzroy, from 1953 to 1962.

He coached Sunshine in the Victorian Football Association after leaving Fitzroy. In 1963, his first season, Sunshine went from second last the previous year to the semi-finals. He led Sunshine to the second division grand final in the 1964 VFA season, which they lost to Geelong West. He coached Sunshine for five seasons from 1963 until 1967.

Notes

External links 

1934 births
2019 deaths
Australian rules footballers from New South Wales
Fitzroy Football Club players
Sunshine Football Club (VFA) players
Sunshine Football Club (VFA) coaches
Deniliquin Football Club players